Hypocritanus lemur is a species of syrphid fly in the family Syrphidae. Until 2020, it was classified in the genus Ocyptamus.

References

External links

 

Syrphini
Articles created by Qbugbot
Taxa named by Carl Robert Osten-Sacken
Insects described in 1877